Wahlgren is a Swedish surname. Notable people with the surname include:

Daniel Wahlgren (born 1966), Swedish rap, ragga and dancehall
Kari Wahlgren (born 1977), American voice actress
Laila Bagge Wahlgren (born 1972), Swedish singer, manager and songwriter
Lars-Anders Wahlgren (born 1966), Swedish tennis player
Lars-Eric Wahlgren (1929-1999), Swedish lieutenant general
Linus Wahlgren (born 1976), Swedish actor
Marie Wahlgren (born 1962), Swedish Liberal People's Party politician
Niclas Wahlgren (born 1965), Swedish singer
Pernilla Wahlgren (born 1967), Swedish singer and actress

See also
Walgreen (disambiguation)
Wallgren

Swedish-language surnames